Melalinjipattu Thiruvanthipuram is one of the revenue village in Cuddalore district of Tamil Nadu, India.

Villages in Cuddalore district